The Chuja Islands are a group of 42 islands in the Jeju Strait, about halfway between Jejudo and the southern coast of Jeollanamdo. Only four islands are inhabited: Sangchuja ("Upper Chuja"), which is connected by a bridge to Hachuja ("Lower Chuja"), the largest by area; Hoengang; and Chupo. The Chuja Islands are administered by Jeju City.
As of December 31, 2019, the population is 1,733, based on the number of citizen registrations.

History
Chuja Islands are administered by Jeju City, but are geographically located adjacent to Wando-gun, Jeolla North Province, and the language and culture is similar to that of Jeolla North Province.

Fishing Industry
Sinyang Fishing Port is a national fishing harbor located at Sinyang-1-ri, and is known for having a vast, arch-type, minimalist coast, and not the concrete that is common at other Korean ports.  Jangjakpyeongsa beach is a popular destination.

Transportation
Chuja Islands can be accessed by boat.  There are two local buses between the islands.

Climate

References 

Archipelagoes of South Korea
Jeju City
Islands of Jeju Province